Gymnothorax punctatus is a moray eel found in coral reefs in the Red Sea. It was first named by Marcus Elieser Bloch and Johann Gottlob Schneider in 1801, and is commonly known as the Red Sea whitespotted moray or the whitespotted moray.

References

punctatus
Fauna of the Red Sea
Fish described in 1801
Taxa named by Marcus Elieser Bloch
Taxa named by Johann Gottlob Theaenus Schneider